Kimblewick, Kimberwicke or Kimberwick
Great and Little Kimble, civil parish in Wycombe district, Buckinghamshire, England
Kimblewick (bit), a mouthpiece for horses
Kimblewick Hunt, a hunt formed in 2002